Endiandra muelleri subsp. bracteata, is a rare rainforest tree growing in eastern Australia. Listed as endangered by extinction. It is a subspecies of the tree known as green-leaved rose walnut, or Mueller's walnut, Endiandra muelleri. It occurs from Maclean, New South Wales to Mackay, Queensland, usually in sub tropical rainforest at the lower altitudes.

If differs from the autonym Endiandra muelleri subsp. muelleri in several respects, mostly regarding small hairs:
 twigs have crooked or twisted hairs, (as well as straight) hairs
 twig hairs can be upright (as well as flat)
 the outer envelope of the flower is hairless (the perianth)
 small branchlets and the lower leaf veins are rusty red with hairs
 leaf domatia or hairy tufts usually absent

References

Trees of Australia
Endangered biota of Queensland
Endangered flora of Australia
Flora of New South Wales
Flora of Queensland
muelleri subsp. bracteata
Laurales of Australia
Plant subspecies
Taxa named by Bernard Hyland